"Powder Veil" is Fayray's 3rd single. It was released on February 10, 1999, and peaked at #30. The song was used as the ending theme for the Nippon TV program "Guruguru Ninety Nine".

Track listing
Powder Veil
Powder Veil (Songria mix)
Powder Veil (Original Backing Track)
Powder Veil (Ayumi Obinata mix)

Charts 
"Powder Veil" - Oricon Sales Chart (Japan)

External links
Fayray Official Site

1999 singles
Fayray songs
1999 songs
Songs with lyrics by Akio Inoue
Songs written by Daisuke Asakura